Arthur Marjeram.  (born 1877–August 1911) was an English footballer who played as a left-back for Aston Villa and Thames Ironworks.

Club career
Marjeram started as an amateur player with Aston Villa before moving south to play for Swanscombe and then Thames Ironworks. He played in the first Thames Ironworks professional side on 1 September 1898 against Sheppey United which they lost 1–0 and in their inaugural Southern League fixture against Shepherd's Bush on 10 September 1898 which they won 3–0. He was a member of the side which won the 1898–99 Southern League Division Two

Honours

Club - Thames Ironworks

1898–99 Southern League Division Two

References

Notes
  Several sources note the surname as "Marjoram". However the 1881, 1891 and 1901 censuses, the book West Ham Who's Who and John Powles book on Thames Ironworks, Iron in the Blood show "Marjeram".

1877 births
1911 deaths
Footballers from Brighton
English footballers
Association football defenders
Thames Ironworks F.C. players
Aston Villa F.C. players
Southern Football League players